Shangyi is a town under the administration of Dongpo District, Meishan, Sichuan, China. , it administers the following ten residential communities and seven villages:
Liuxiang Community
Xiyan Community
Quanyi Community
Qili Community
Xiang'er Community
Baima Community
Zhongdian Community
Hongqi Community
Yingyong Community
Wanhua Community
Shulin Village
Yunge Village
Taibao Village
Guanyin Village
Qiaolou Village
Tielu Village
Gong Village

In December 2019, the towns of Xiang'er and Baima were abolished, with Shangyi absorbing their administrative areas.

References 

Township-level divisions of Sichuan
Meishan